Frank Harold Hobson, MC (8 October 1894 – 1951) was a British flying ace of the First World War, credited with 15 aerial victories.

Biography
Hobson was born in Leeds, Yorkshire, on 8 October 1894. He originally served in the Royal Engineers, but transferred to the Royal Flying Corps, being commissioned a temporary second lieutenant (on probation) on 10 May 1917. In September 1917, he scored his first victory while he was assigned to No. 65 Squadron RFC. Flying Sopwith Camel No. B2305, he drove down an Albatros D.V out of control. He then scored triumphs in every month between then and March 1918, except for February. A summary of his record shows ten enemy aircraft destroyed and five driven down out of control. He was awarded the Military Cross on 4 March 1918.

Following his last victory on 25 March 1918, Hobson was removed from combat duty and assigned to No. 72 Training Squadron in the Home Establishment in England. He ended his duty and left the service in February 1919. He died in Leicester on 5 May 1951.

Honours and awards
Military Cross
Temporary 2nd Lieutenant Frank Hobson, General List and Royal Flying Corps.
For conspicuous gallantry and devotion to duty. He has destroyed several enemy aeroplanes and driven others down out of control. On one occasion he descended to a height of 100 feet and attacked a party of the enemy with his machine gun, inflicting several casualties on them. He has shown splendid resource and determination on all occasions.

References
Citations

Bibliography

1894 births
1951 deaths
Military personnel from Leeds
British Army personnel of World War I
People from West Bridgford
Royal Engineers soldiers
Royal Flying Corps officers
Royal Air Force personnel of World War I
British World War I flying aces
Recipients of the Military Cross